West Cape Howe National Park is a national park in Western Australia,  southeast of Perth. The park is found between Albany and Denmark within the City of Albany and in the Great Southern region.

Torbay Head, the most southerly point of the mainland of Western Australia, is situated within the park.

History 

The park began as being vested in the Shire of Albany in 1977 for the purposes of recreation. By 1985 the area was gazetted as  C Class Reserve after agreement between the shire and vested in the National Parks and Nature Conservancy Authority. Following the addition of an extra  that was a timber reserve along the northern boundary the park was given an A Class status in 1987.
The rare and ancient Main's assassin spider, currently listed as threatened, was found to inhabit the park during a survey conducted in 2008.

Flora 

The park is home to a range of habitats including karri forest, coastal heath and wetlands each of which support a diverse array of vegetation and plant species. The area around Lake William supports a dense sedge scrub and rare species such as Amperea volubilus and an unnamed species of Melaleuca. The Albany Pitcher Plant, Cephalotus follicularis, is also found in the park.

Facilities

Due to the sandy nature of many of the tracks, much of the park is accessible only to four-wheel drive vehicles, although all vehicles may reach the popular Shelley Beach where a campground is located. Shelley Beach also has a look-out, toilet and barbecue launching  facilities for hang-gliders. The nearby Golden Gate Beach is also a popular location for surfers.

Western Australia's long-distance walking trail, the Bibbulmun Track passes through the park. The park has many facilities for bushwalkers, with a  return trip spur-trail from the track to Torbay Head and a boardwalk section of the track. In the West of the park, there is an overnight shelter for walkers that sleeps 12-15 persons, named "West Cape Howe Campsite".

References

See also
 Protected areas of Western Australia
 West Cape Howe

National parks of Western Australia
Great Southern (Western Australia)
Protected areas established in 1985
South coast of Western Australia
1985 establishments in Australia
Warren bioregion